René Benausse (born 23 September 1929 in Carcassonne – died 29 November 2013 in Villalier) was a French rugby league footballer who played in the 1960s. He is the older brother of fellow rugby league footballer Gilbert Benausse, alongside which he played for Lézignan.

Playing career
At club level, Benausse played first for AS Carcassonne, and then for FC Lézignan XIII.
He was capped twice for France and took part at the 1960 Rugby League World Cup. Both of this international caps were two test matches against Great Britain.

Personal life
Outside the pitch, he worked as an accountant.

Honours
French Rugby League Championship
 French Champion :1952, 1953, 1955 (Carcassonne),  1961, and 1963 (Lézignan)
 Runner-up in 1959 (Lézignan)
Lord Derby Cup
Champion in 1952 (Carcassonne) and 1960 (Lézignan)
Runner-up in 1961 (Lézignan)

References

External links
René Benausse profile at rugbyleagueproject.com

1929 births
2013 deaths
AS Carcassonne players
France national rugby league team players
French rugby league players
Lézignan Sangliers players
People from Carcassonne
Rugby league wingers
Sportspeople from Aude